Euxoa culminicola is a moth of the family Noctuidae. It is found in the Alps and Pyrenees in Austria, France, Italy, Spain and Switzerland.

Description
Warren states E. culminicola Stgr. (6e). Like simplonia, but larger; the forewing pale fuscous suffused with pale yellow and roughly dusted; orbicular and reniform stigmata diffuse; hindwing with the base paler. Switzerland and the Tyrol.
 The wingspan is 39–43 mm.

Biology
Euxoa culminicola occurs only in a few places in the Alps and Pyrenees above the tree line at altitudes between 2000 and 3000 meters. 
way of life
There is species one generation per year, the moths fly in July and August. The moths are active during the day and at night. They have been observed nectar feeding during the day. The larvae live from September. They overwinter and pupate in May of the following year.

References

External links
Fauna Europaea
lepiforum.de

Euxoa
Moths of Europe
Moths described in 1870